JPMorgan European Discovery, formerly the JP Morgan European Fledgling Investment Trust, is a large British investment trust. Established in 1990, it is dedicated to investments in smaller European companies. The Chairman is Carolan Dobson. It is listed on the London Stock Exchange and is a constituent of the FTSE 250 Index. The company changed its name from JPMorgan European Smaller Companies Trust to JPMorgan European Discovery Trust on 15 June 2021.

References

External links
  Official site

Investment trusts of the United Kingdom
JPMorgan Chase